Terra State Community College is a public community college in Fremont, Ohio.  It was founded in 1968 as Vanguard Technical Institute, a night school using the facilities of Vanguard Vocational Center.  Terra's district includes Sandusky, Seneca, and the eastern portion of Ottawa counties.

History
Terra State Community College was founded as Vanguard Technical Institute in September 1968, a night school at Vanguard Vocational Center. It has been authorized to grant associate degrees in applied business and associate degrees in applied science since 1969. The college was renamed Terra Technical College in 1973 and Terra State Community College in 1994.

Campus

In the fall of 2018, Terra State became the second community college in Ohio to offer residential housing. The first dorm, The Landings, cost 19.6 million dollars, and had a capacity to house 225 students with 93,445 square feet of space.

In the fall of 2019 Terra State began work with the Sandusky County Parks District to connect their campus with the North Coast Inland Bike Trail, and by extension Fremont.

In fall 2019 the college expanded their athletics center. This coincided with the college bringing back their athletics program after a 14 year hiatus.

Organization and Administration

Presidents
 Roy Klay 1968-1978
Richard Simon 1979-1993
Charlotte Lee 1993-2003
Marsha Bordner 2003-2012
Jerome Webster 2014-2018
 Ron Schumacher 2018–Present

Student Organizations and clubs
 Phi Theta Kappa
 Student Government
 Black Student Union
 Stock Study Investment Club - A Mock investment club.

Associations
 Student Nurses Association (SNA)
 Health Information Technology  (HIT)
 Medical Assisting Student Association (MASO)

References

External links
 

Buildings and structures in Fremont, Ohio
Educational institutions established in 1968
Education in Sandusky County, Ohio
Community colleges in Ohio
1968 establishments in Ohio